Mississippi Highway 430 (MS 430) is a   east-west state highway in north-central Mississippi. It runs from the city of Greenwood, through the community of Blackhawk, to the town of Vaiden.

Route description
MS 430 begins in the Mississippi Delta region in Leflore County in the city of Greenwood at an intersection with U.S. Route 82 (US 82)/MS 7 just southeast of downtown. It heads southeast as a four-lane undivided highway through neighborhoods before leaving Greenwood and narrowing to two-lanes. The highway then crosses over Pelucia Creek before entering Carroll County.

State maintenance of the highway temporarily ends at the county line as MS 430 travels southeast through farmland. It winds its way up some Loess bluffs, where it climbs out of the Mississippi Delta as it gains some serious elevation. State maintenance resumes at this intersection. MS 430 passes remote woodlands for about  before re-entering farmland and entering the Vaiden city limits, where it comes to an intersection and runs concurrently with MS 35. They head west to have an interchange with Interstate 55 (I-55) at its exit 174 before MS 430 splits off along Mulberry Street and passes straight through downtown. MS 430 comes to an end shortly thereafter at an intersection with US 51.

Major intersections

References

External links

430
Transportation in Leflore County, Mississippi
Transportation in Carroll County, Mississippi